This is a list of broadcast television stations that are licensed in the U.S. state of Tennessee.

Full-power stations
VC refers to the station's PSIP virtual channel. RF refers to the station's physical RF channel.

Defunct full-power stations
Channel 17: WMCV - Ind. - Nashville (1968-1971)
Channel 20: WINT-TV - Ind. - Crossville (late 1980s?)
Channel 55: WCPT-TV - Ind. - Crossville (10/3/1976-1983)

LPTV stations

Defunct low-power stations
Channel 6: W06AW - (Unity Broadcasting Network) - Selmer
Channel 11 (RF channel 11): WJDP-LD - Pigeon Forge
Channel 12: WFEM-LP - Family net/ local independent- Heiskell
Channel 12: WRMX-LP - HSN - Nashville
Channel 13: WLLP-CA - (Ind.) - Lawrenceburg
Channel 32: WEEE-LP - (UATV/UPN/FamilyNet/Ind.) - Knoxville
Channel 36: W36AK - (TBN/WPGD-TV rebroadcast) - Nashville 
Channel 42: W42BY - Three Angels Broadcasting Network - Memphis
Channel 50: W50CG - (3ABN) - Knoxville

Translators

See also
 Tennessee media
 List of newspapers in Tennessee
 List of radio stations in Tennessee
 Media of cities in Tennessee: Chattanooga, Knoxville, Memphis, Murfreesboro, Nashville

Bibliography

External links
 
  (Directory ceased in 2017)
 Tennessee Association of Broadcasters
 
 
 

Tennessee

Television stations